Bad Blood is a 1981 British-New Zealand thriller film set during World War II in the small town of Koiterangi (now Kowhitirangi) on the west coast of the South Island of New Zealand, and is based on the factual manhunt for mass-murderer Stanley Graham. The film was directed by English director Mike Newell, who went on to direct Four Weddings and a Funeral. Much of the film was shot at the original locations. The script was based upon Manhunt: The Story of Stanley Graham, by H. A. Willis (Whitcoulls, 1979) and adapted by New Zealand-born Andrew Brown.

Plot
In October 1941 Stan Graham, a Westland smallholder, develops a persecution complex and starts to threaten his neighbours, in which he is encouraged by his wife. He then refuses to conform to a government order for all citizens to surrender their firearms for the duration of the war. Eventually a party of four policemen arrive to confiscate his firearms, which causes a flashpoint for Graham. With the help of his wife who shoots and injures one of them, Graham shoots and kills all the policemen and, in the ensuing altercations, three locals also. Shot and injured himself, Graham then heads into the surrounding forest. A manhunt is organised, involving police, army and local home guard members, and finally they track him down.

Cast
 Jack Thompson as Stanley Graham
 Carol Burns as Dorothy Graham
 Denis Lill as Ted Best
 Martyn Sanderson as Les North
 Kelly Johnson as Jim Quirke
 Bruce Allpress as Inspector Calwell
 Ken Blackburn as Thommo Robson
 Cliff Wood as Henry Growcott
 Dulcie Smart as Evelyn Gibson
 Miranda Harcourt as Ivy Smith
 Peter Vere Jones as Mr Ogier

Release
Bad Blood was originally made for TV and screened in Britain in 1981. It was released in New Zealand on 12 November 1982.
It was released on DVD in May 2006 and again on 16 September 2009. It was also released in the United Kingdom and in North America on 2 October 2007.

Reception
Bad Blood received rave reviews in Britain and later in New Zealand. Although considered risky when released, Bad Blood is now regarded as a New Zealand film classic.

References

External links 
 Crime NZ: Stanley Graham Murders
 Interview with Jack Thompson
 

1981 films
1980s thriller drama films
1980s English-language films
British thriller drama films
New Zealand thriller drama films
Films directed by Mike Newell
Films set in 1941
1981 drama films
1980s British films